Christmas Cracker (French: Caprice de Noël) is a 1963 animated short about Christmas, co-directed by Norman McLaren, Gerald Potterton, Grant Munro and Jeff Hale for the National Film Board of Canada. It was nominated for an Oscar in 1965.

Synopsis
Christmas Cracker features Grant Munro as a playful clown who presents three segments: a rendition of "Jingle Bells" in which cutout animation figures dance, a dime-store rodeo of tin toys and a story about decorating the perfect Christmas tree with a Christmas star. Between each segment, the clown does a short transition while a chiptune rendition of "The Holly and the Ivy" plays.

Jingle Bells
The first of three segments presented by the clown displays two cutout animation figures dance together while a guitar rendition of "Jingle Bells". The figures are wearing trapezoids as clothing with boots. As the guitar progresses, the cutout animation figures’ dancing accelerates.

Tin Toys
The second segment is stop-motion animation of toys coming to life. In this short film is a tin butterfly, alligator, bird, robot, clown, and cat. The background music is a fast guitar, accompanied with a bass guitar playing jazz. The clown then joins back into the movie following electric music.

Christmas Tree Decoration
The final segment is a little cartoon man decorating the ultimate Christmas tree. The music, unlike the two other segments, strays away from guitar and is played by an organ. This adds dramatic effect to the decoration of the Christmas tree. This segment was later expanded into a half-hour special by Gerald Potterton called "George and the Christmas Star", which followed the same basic premise.

Awards
 Golden Gate International Film Festival, San Francisco: First Prize, Best Animated Short, 1964
 Electronic, Nuclear and Teleradio Cinematographic Review, Rome: Grand Prize for Technique, Films for Children, 1965
 Electronic, Nuclear and Teleradio Cinematographic Review, Rome: Grand Prize for Animation Technique, 1965
 Film Centrum Foundation Film Show, Naarden, Netherlands: Silver Squirrel, Second Prize 1966
 Philadelphia International Festival of Short Films, Philadelphia: Award of Exceptional Merit, 1967
 Landers Associates Annual Awards, Los Angeles: Award of Merit, 1965
 37th Academy Awards, Los Angeles: Nominee: Best Short Subject – Cartoons, 1965

Related films
 Noël Noël 
 An Old Box

References

External links
 
 
 RiffTrax

1963 short films
Animated films without speech
Canadian Christmas films
National Film Board of Canada animated short films
Films directed by Norman McLaren
Films directed by Gerald Potterton
1960s animated short films
1963 animated films
Canadian children's animated films
Films scored by Maurice Blackburn
Films scored by Eldon Rathburn
Canadian animated short films
Quebec films
National Film Board of Canada short films
1960s Canadian films